Frank Love (22 February 1888 – 27 May 1969) was an Australian rules footballer who played with Richmond in the Victorian Football League (VFL).

Notes

External links 

1888 births
1969 deaths
Australian rules footballers from Victoria (Australia)
Richmond Football Club players